"The Sunshine of Your Smile" is a British popular song published in London in 1913 just before the First World War by Francis, Day and Hunter. The lyrics were by Leonard Cooke and the music by Lilian Ray. It became a top ten hit in the UK Singles Chart in 1980, sung by Mike Berry.

Lyrics

The following lyrics are taken from the sheet music published in 1913:

Verse 1:
Dear face that holds so sweet a smile for me,
Were you not mine, how dark the world would be!
I know no light above that could replace
Love's radiant sunshine in your dear, dear face.

Refrain:
Give me your smile, the love-light in your eyes,
Life could not hold a fairer Paradise!
Give me the right to love you all the while,
My world for ever, the sunshine of your smile!

Verse 2:
Shadows may fall upon the land and sea,
Sunshine from all the world may hidden be;
But I shall see no cloud across the sun;
Your smile shall light my life, till life is done!

Refrain:
Give me your smile, the love-light in your eyes,
Life could not hold a fairer Paradise!
Give me the right to love you all the while,
My world for ever, the sunshine of your smile!

Recordings
Below is a list of artists who have recorded the song and the recording date and record information (where known):

 Olga, Elga and Eli Hudson, 1914
 Fred Douglas, 1914
 Ernest Pike, 1914
 Jessie Broughton, c. 1915
 William Thomas, c. 1915, Regal G6745
 Gertie Dickeson, 1915
 Lambert Murphy, 1916, Victor 55069
 John McCormack, 1916, Victor 64622
 Norah Johnson, 1916
 Riccardo Stracciari, 1919, Columbia 49590
 Tamaki Miura, 1922, Nipponophone 15065
 Charles Hackett, 1927, Columbia 4042
 Tito Schipa, 1930, Victor 1451 (Sung in Spanish)
 Jussi Björling, 1931, Swedish HMV X3724 (Sung in Swedish)
 Django Reinhardt & Le Quintette du Hot Club De France, April 1935
 Lilian Davies, 1930
 Frank Sinatra, 1941, Victor 27638
 James Melton, 1950
 Mike Berry, 1980

References

1913 songs
Songs of World War I
British songs